The women's 3000 metres relay at the 2007 Asian Winter Games was held on January 29 and 31, 2007 at the Wuhuan Gymnasium, China.

Schedule
All times are China Standard Time (UTC+08:00)

Results
Legend
DSQ — Disqualified

Semifinals

Heat 1

Heat 2

Final

References

Semifinals
Finals

External links
Official website

Women Relay